Valiabad (also Romanized as Valīābād; also known as ‘Alīābād) is a village in Takab Rural District, Shahdad District, Kerman County, Kerman Province, Iran. At the 2006 census, its population was 148, in 34 families.

References 

Populated places in Kerman County